Events from the year 1368 in France

Incumbents
 Monarch – Charles V

Events
A royal library was founded at the Louvre Palace by Charles V in 1368. The Bibliothèque nationale de France traces its origin to this library.

Births

3 December – Charles VI of France (died 1422).

Deaths

Full date missing
Guy de Chauliac, physician and surgeon (born c.1300)

References

1360s in France